The 2013–14 FC Augsburg season was the 107th season in the football club's history and third consecutive season in the top flight of German football, the Bundesliga, having been promoted from the 2. Bundesliga in 2011. FC Augsburg also participated in the season's edition of the DFB-Pokal. It was the fifth season for Augsburg in the SGL arena.

Review and events

Summer transfer window

Halil Altıntop transferred to FC Augsburg.

August
In August, the 2013–14 FC Augsburg season started with the first round of the DFB-Pokal. Andreas Ottl was injured during pre–season and missed the start of the season. The match was against RB Leipzig on 2 August. Augsburg won 2–0 with goals from Jan-Ingwer Callsen-Bracker and Halil Altıntop. Then Augsburg faced Borussia Dortmund in the first matchday of the Bundesliga on 10 August. Augsburg lost 4–0. Pierre-Emerick Aubameyang scored the first three goals and Robert Lewandowski added the fourth from the penalty spot. Augsburg finished the matchday in 17th place in the table. Then Augsburg went on to face Werder Bremen on 17 August. Werder Bremen won 1–0 with a goal from Mehmet Ekici. Augsburg remained in 17th place in the table. Augsburg then faced VfB Stuttgart on 25 August. Augsburg won 2–1. Augsburg got goals from Altıntop and Callsen-Bracker. Vedad Ibišević scored for Stuttgart. Augsburg moved up to 12th place in the table. Augsburg finished up August against 1. FC Nürnberg on 31 August. Augsburg won 1–0 with a goal from Kevin Vogt. Augsburg finished August in 10th place in the table.

September
FC Augsburg began September with matchday 5 of the Bundesliga against SC Freiburg on 14 September. Augsburg won 2–1. Halil Altıntop and Tobias Werner scored for Augsburg. Admir Mehmedi scored for Freiburg. Augsburg finished the matchday in sixth place in the table. Augsburg went on to face Hannover 96 on 21 September. Hannover won 2–1. Hannover got goals from Artur Sobiech and Szabolcs Huszti. Paul Verhaegh scored for Augsburg. Augsburg was in eighth place in the table after the matchday. Then Augsburg went on to face Preußen Münster in the second round of the DFB-Pokal. Augsburg won 3–0. Augsburg got goals from Tobias Werner and Sascha Mölders. Werner scored twice. Augsburg faced Borussia Mönchengladbach on 27 September. The match ended in a 2–2 draw. André Hahn and Arkadiusz Milik scored for Augsburg. Max Kruse and Branimir Hrgota scored for Borussia Mönchengladbach. Augsburg finished September in tied for eighth place in the table. Augsburg finished September with the draw for the third round for the DFB-Pokal on 29 September. Augsburg was drawn against Bayern Munich.

October
FC Augsburg started October with a match against Schalke 04 on 5 October. Schalke won 4–1. Sascha Mölders scored for Augsburg. Kevin-Prince Boateng, Ádám Szalai and Max Meyer scored for Schalke. Ádám Szalai scored two goals. Augsburg finished the matchday in 12th place.

Fixtures and results

Legend

Bundesliga

League fixtures and results

League table

Results summary

DFB-Pokal

Player information

Squad and statistics

Squad, appearances and goals

|}

Minutes played

Discipline

Bookings

Suspensions

Transfers
Transfers made during the 2013 summer transfer window:
List of German football transfers summer 2013 − FC Augsburg

In

Out

References

FC Augsburg seasons
Augsburg season 2013-14